Nikolaj Hansen (born 14 September 1994) is a Danish footballer who plays as a winger or forward for USL Championship club San Antonio FC. He previously appeared at the semi-professional level for Seattle Sounders FC U-23 and professionally with Columbus Crew SC, Houston Dynamo, and Minnesota United.

At a young age, Hansen moved to the United States and attended Jesuit High School. He played in college at New Mexico, appearing on an all-conference team in each of his four years with the Lobos and winning two conference titles. He also appeared with Seattle Sounders FC U-23 during the collegiate offseason. Hansen was selected by Columbus Crew SC in the first round of the 2017 MLS SuperDraft; he scored on his professional debut that March. He is eligible to play for either the Denmark or United States national teams and is a citizen of both countries.

Early life
Born in Randers, Denmark, Hansen grew up in Oksbøl before moving to the United States at the age of 10. His family settled in Sacramento, California, where he attended Jesuit High School. As a senior, he scored 35 goals for the Marauders and was named as an NSCAA High School All-American. Hansen was also selected to take part in the NSCAA High School All-American Game.

Hansen played club soccer with Davis Legacy, where he was teammates with Ahkello Witherspoon, and with Placer United during his time in California. He committed to play college soccer for coach Jeremy Fishbein and the New Mexico Lobos.

College and amateur
On 6 February 2013, Hansen was officially confirmed as part of the New Mexico roster, one of eight recruits brought in by the Lobos ahead of the 2013 season. He made his collegiate debut on 31 August, starting and scoring two goals as part of a 7–2 victory over Villanova. Hansen also scored on his Conference USA (C-USA) debut, tallying a goal in a 3–1 victory over Marshall, and notched an assist in his NCAA Tournament debut against George Mason. Finishing the season with seven goals and five assists in 22 appearances, he was named to the C-USA All-Freshman Team. As a sophomore, Hansen appeared 18 times and scored five goals. In one mid-season stretch, he scored three match-winning goals in four games: against Virginia Commonwealth, West Virginia, and Florida International. At the end of the season, he was named to the All-CUSA Third Team.

Ahead of his junior season, Hansen was called up to the United States U23 national team, taking part in a college identification training camp ahead of the 2015 CONCACAF Men's Olympic Qualifying Championship. He stepped straight back into form after returning to New Mexico, scoring goals in back-to-back matches against Missouri State and American in September. He scored just one more time on the season, but was named Second Team All-CUSA, with a total of three goals and three assists from 18 appearances. As a senior, Hansen appeared 21 times while leading the Lobos to their first C-USA tournament title since joining the conference four years prior. On 17 September, he scored his first career hat trick in a 3–1 victory over UC Irvine. Hansen tallied a career-high 13 goals during the year, earned a spot on the C-USA All-Tournament Team, and was named to the All-CUSA First Team. He finished his collegiate career with 28 goals in 79 appearances.

Seattle Sounders FC U-23
Following his freshman season at New Mexico, Hansen played for Seattle Sounders FC U-23 in the Premier Development League. He made his debut for the club on 16 May in a season-opening defeat against Lane United. Two weeks later, Hansen added his first Sounders FC U-23 goal, a 54th-minute tally in a 3–0 victory over Vancouver Whitecaps FC U-23. After tacking on another goal in mid-June, Hansen finished the campaign with two goals and an assist in his lone season with Seattle.

Club career

Columbus Crew SC

Columbus Crew SC selected Hansen with the ninth overall pick in the 2017 MLS SuperDraft. Because he had already signed a league-guaranteed contract before the draft, he was automatically added to the Columbus roster without having to negotiate a contract with the club. Hansen made his club and professional debut on 25 March against Portland Timbers, replacing Justin Meram in the 60th minute of a tied match. He went on to provide Crew SC with a 3–2 victory, scoring the game-winning goal in the 84th minute. Hansen missed 14 matches during the summer after undergoing surgery to repair an inguinal hernia and then suffering a thigh strain upon his return to training. He returned in time for Columbus' playoff run, appearing as an extra time substitute in the knockout round against Atlanta United. He scored in the penalty shootout as Crew SC advanced by a 3–1 margin. After finishing the season with one goal in 16 appearances, Hansen had his contract option picked up by the club.

Hansen was expected to challenge for a starting spot at the beginning of the 2018 season following the departure of Justin Meram, but suffered a pulled hamstring during preseason camp. He found his form in the later part of the year, scoring a match-tying goal against Chicago Fire on 23 August and bagging a brace in a 3–2 defeat against Portland on 19 September. For a second consecutive season, Hansen scored in a knockout round penalty shootout, this time helping Columbus advance over D.C. United by a 3–2 result. However, he missed the conference semifinals against New York Red Bulls after picking up an ankle injury against D.C. After appearing 24 times and scoring three goals, Hansen again had his contract option picked up by the club.

Following the 2018 season, Hansen had surgery on his ankle; during the 2019 preseason, he suffered two setbacks, tearing scar tissue in the same ankle then suffering a torn hamstring in his preseason debut. He returned to full health after missing five league matches, appearing off the bench on 6 April against New England Revolution. He struggled to earn a spot in the rotation under new head coach Caleb Porter, appearing in just nine matches under Porter. Hansen was traded to Houston in early August, ending his time in Columbus with four goals from 49 appearances in all competitions.

Houston Dynamo
On 8 August 2019, Hansen was traded to Houston Dynamo in exchange for $75,000 in targeted allocation money. He made his debut for the Dynamo three days later, entering as a substitute in a 2–1 defeat against Philadelphia Union, and went on to make four appearances during his first season in Houston. Following the campaign, the Dynamo picked up the option on Hansen's contract.

At the beginning of the 2020 season, Hansen made one substitute appearance before the season was halted due to the COVID-19 pandemic. He played just one time in the MLS is Back Tournament, but became a regular part of the rotation once the regular season resumed, appearing in all but three games the rest of the way. Hansen scored his first Dynamo goal on 25 August and added an assist as part of a 5–2 victory against Sporting Kansas City. After scoring in October against Minnesota United, he finished the season with two goals from 17 appearances. His contract expired following the season, but Hansen was extended a contract offer and was protected by the Dynamo ahead of the 2020 MLS Expansion Draft. He opted out of the 2020 MLS Re-Entry Draft.

Minnesota United
After failing to reach an agreement with the Dynamo on a new deal, Hansen was traded to Minnesota United on 18 March 2021 in exchange for $125,000 in general allocation money. He signed a two-year contract, with the Loons holding an option for a third year. Hansen starred in preseason, tying for the team lead in goals with four. However, he then suffered a left thigh injury that ruled him out for the first six games of the season. Hansen made his club debut on 29 May, entering the match against Real Salt Lake as a substitute. He promptly scored in the 78th minute, earning the Loons a 1–1 draw. He was a consistent feature in the lineup through the summer, but then suffered a groin injury in mid-August that cost him another seven games. Hansen played just five times during the remainder of the season, although one of those came in the first round of the 2021 MLS Cup Playoffs against Portland Timbers. He concluded his first year in Minnesota with one goal and one assist from 13 total appearances. Following the 2022 season, his contract option was declined by Minnesota.

San Antonio FC
On 11 January 2023, Hansen signed with USL Championship side San Antonio FC on a one-year deal.

Career statistics

Honors
New Mexico
 Conference USA (regular season): 2013
 Conference USA Men's Soccer Tournament: 2016

Individual
 C-USA All-Freshman Team: 2013
 Third Team All-CUSA: 2014
 Second Team All-CUSA: 2015
 First Team All-CUSA: 2016
 C-USA All Tournament Team: 2016
 NSCAA All-Southwest Region First Team: 2016

See also

 All-time Columbus Crew roster
 All-time Houston Dynamo roster
 List of Minnesota United FC players
 List of Danish Americans
 List of foreign MLS players

References

External links

 New Mexico profile
 
 Niko Hansen at FBRef.com
 

Living people
1994 births
Danish men's footballers
Sportspeople from the Central Denmark Region
People from Randers
Association football utility players
New Mexico Lobos men's soccer players
Seattle Sounders FC U-23 players
Columbus Crew draft picks
Columbus Crew players
Houston Dynamo FC players
Minnesota United FC players
San Antonio FC players
Major League Soccer players
MLS Next Pro players
USL League Two players
Danish expatriate men's footballers
Expatriate soccer players in the United States
Danish expatriate sportspeople in the United States